Hiala may refer to:
 Hiala, Nawanshahr, a village in Punjab, India
 Niala, Iran, also known as Hiala, a village in Mazandaran Province, Iran

See also 
 Hyala, a genus of snails
 Chiala mountain salamander